"Make No Mistake, He's Mine" is a song written by Kim Carnes, recorded as a duet with Barbra Streisand in 1984. The duet was subsequently recorded as "Make No Mistake, She's Mine" by Ronnie Milsap and Kenny Rogers in 1987.  Both versions of the song charted.

In the wake of the Glee cover, where a man and woman sing about a female lover, Carnes said there were now "three different meanings of the song", regarding the malleability of the piece as "rewarding and gratifying".

Barbra Streisand and Kim Carnes recording
The song was recorded by Streisand and Carnes, co-produced (with Bill Cuomo) by Carnes, It was released on Streisand's 1984 album Emotion and as a single in December 1984, it hit #8 on the Adult Contemporary chart and #51 on the Billboard Hot 100 in early 1985.

In 1985 Carnes become the first artist to appear on the Billboard charts as part of a solo ("Invitation To Dance"), duet ("Make No Mistake, He's Mine"), and trio ("What About Me?") at the same time.

"Make No Mistake" later appeared on Carnes' 1993 compilation album Gypsy Honeymoon. The song was also featured on Streisand's 2002 compilation Duets.

A solo rendition by Carnes surfaced as a bonus track on the 2001 CD reissue of her 1985 album Barking at Airplanes.

Critical reception 
Billboard said Streisand was "wonderfully feisty" in the duet. Other outlets at the time compared the "lovely song" to "The Girl Is Mine", given the common theme of possessiveness between rivals. A decade later Streisand and Carnes were praised for "brilliant vocal performances" that sounded as contemporary in 1993 as they did in 1984.

Charts

Ronnie Milsap and Kenny Rogers recording

"Make No Mistake, She's Mine" was recorded as a duet single by country pop artists Ronnie Milsap and Kenny Rogers in 1987.

The song topped the Billboard country chart and peaked at No. 42 on the Adult Contemporary chart. The song was later included on Ronnie Milsap's Heart & Soul and Kenny Rogers' I Prefer the Moonlight.

The song won a Grammy award for Best Country Collaboration with Vocals.

Charts

In popular culture
In 2013 Naya Rivera and Chord Overstreet sang the "She's Mine" version for the "Diva" episode of the television series Glee.

References

1984 singles
Kim Carnes songs
Barbra Streisand songs
1987 singles
Ronnie Milsap songs
Kenny Rogers songs
Male vocal duets
Songs written by Kim Carnes
Song recordings produced by Kyle Lehning
RCA Records singles
1984 songs
Female vocal duets